Egyptomania refers to a period of renewed interest in the culture of ancient Egypt sparked by Napoleon's Egyptian Campaign in the 19th century. Napoleon was accompanied by many scientists and scholars during this campaign, which led to a large interest in the documentation of ancient monuments in Egypt. Thorough documentation of ancient ruins led to an increase in the interest about ancient Egypt. Jean-François Champollion deciphered the ancient hieroglyphs in 1822 by using the Rosetta Stone that was recovered by French troops in 1799 which began the study of scientific Egyptology.

Culture 

The fascination with ancient Egypt manifested through literature, architecture, art, film, politics and religion. Very few people could afford a trip to Egypt during the peak of Egyptomania and only made contact with Egyptian culture through literature, art, and architecture. Particularly influential were Vivant Denon's Voyage dans la Basse et la Haute Égypte, the Institute of Egypt's Description de l'Égypte, and Verdi's Aida. 

Egyptian images and symbols also served for more trivial purposes, such as dessert services, furniture, decoration, commercial kitsch and advertising. Parties and public events were held that had Egypt as a theme, where people wore special costumes. Even today, this kind of fascination for Egypt and all things Egyptian still exists. Exhibitions about Egyptian culture in museums throughout the world demonstrate continued interest. 

An example, which also reflected upon the cultural meaning of this fascination, is the exhibition "Egyptomania: Egypt in Western Art, 1730-1930" (Paris, Musée Du Louvre, 20 January – 18 April 1994; Ottawa, National Gallery of Canada, 17 June – 18 September 1994; Vienna, Kunsthistorisches Museum, 16 October 1994 – 29 January 1995). The exhibition catalog was published by The National Gallery of Canada in 1994 (Humbert et al.).

American literature, visual art and architecture absorbed what was becoming general knowledge about ancient Egyptian culture, making use of this knowledge in the contemporary debate about national identity, race, and slavery. Elements of Egyptian culture became particularly symbolically charged. The mummy, for example, represented the fascination of the Americans with the living dead and reanimation. This went so far that 'mummy unwrapping parties' were organized. 

The figure of Cleopatra, hieroglyphic writing and deciphering, and the pyramid as a maze are other examples of how ancient Egypt has captivated Western imaginations, and specifically in the United States since the nineteenth century. Literary works that make use of these symbolic references to Egypt include "Some Words With a Mummy" by E. A. Poe, "Lost in a Pyramid, or The Mummy's Curse" by Louisa May Alcott or The Marble Faun by Nathaniel Hawthorne. The impact of ancient Egyptian culture in architecture is called the Egyptian Revival, an expression of neoclassicism in the United States. Egyptian images, forms and symbols were integrated in the contemporary style. This influence can best be seen in the architecture of cemeteries, such as the use of obelisks as headstones, and prisons.

Egyptian Revival symbols and architecture was used for cemetery gateways, tombstones, and public memorials in the 19th and early 20th century. Pyramid Mausoleums, flat-roofed mastabas, lotus columns, obelisks, and sphinxes were popular in 19th century rural or garden cemeteries. For example, the gateway of Mount Auburn Cemetery in Boston and the Grove Street Cemetery in New Haven, Connecticut were constructed in the Egyptian Revival style.

Other examples of this influence are the Gold Pyramid House in Illinois and the Obelisk (Washington Monument) in Washington, D.C. Movies such as The Mummy (1999) (itself a remake of a 1932 Boris Karloff film) and its sequels demonstrate that ancient Egypt and the discovery of its secrets are still of interest for contemporary western minds. Scholarly texts about this phenomenon in American culture include Scott Trafton's Egypt Land (2004) and M. J. Schueller's U.S. Orientalism (1998).

However, the fascination of Egypt did not begin with Napoleon. Ancient Greeks and Romans also took interest in Ancient Egypt's culture and reflected their interests in texts such as Herodotus' Histories and the Bibliotheca historica. When Egyptomania arrived in Rome after Emperor Augustus conquered Egypt in 31 BCE, the fascination led to similar architecture like a tomb designed as a pyramid as erected by the high official Caius Cestius. Additionally, Emperor Hadrian had his deceased lover revered as the Egyptian god of the afterlife, Osiris.

Science 
Craniology is the study of the human cranium that claimed to be able to determine an individual's intelligence and character. Egyptian mummies served as a source for the object of study – skulls. Craniology was used to determine whether Egyptians were black or white, a debate lead in light of the justification of slavery. The key figure for this period seems to be Samuel George Morton who founded the American School of Ethnology.

He put forward the theory of Polygenesis claiming that there is not one but several human races who are in a hierarchical order with whites at the top and blacks at the bottom end of the scale. 

Although science today disapproves of Morton's findings it still revalidated his professional status, because Morton's American School was to a large degree responsible for the development of the current professional status of the sciences and the renunciation of puritan ideas of monogenesis and the Christian clerical worldview, which was common at the time.

Race and national identity in the United States 
 According to Richard White, Egypt is not easily placed within Africa or Asia, or within the East or the West. Therefore, it seems as if Egypt is "everybody's past". The figure of Egypt has been a point of reference in the development of national identity in the western World, though these processes of identity formation are complex and involve many factors. Racial identity is central to these processes, particularly in the United States, where the emerging sense of a distinct national identity and the increasing conflict over slavery were linked in the first half of the 19th century.

Paschal Beverly Randolph crystallized the way in which Egypt served as a model for the new nation when he said, "For America, read Africa; for the United States, Egypt" (1863). Among the variety of ethnic groups that formed the population of the United States, the common denominator was being non-black, being able to define oneself using a binaristic Other. 

Historically, the attempt to scientifically establish a racial hierarchy as undertaken by the American School of Ethnology evoked an understanding of whiteness as the natural American national identity. The racial identity of Egyptian pharaohs was used especially by 19th century scientists such as Samuel George Morton and his contemporaries to confirm the contemporary American racial hierarchy. This hierarchy served proponents of slavery to justify the inhuman treatment of slaves and the denial of civil rights for any but white Americans. 

Types of Mankind (1854), the culmination of American School racial thinking, contains a chapter on the racial characteristics of the ancient Egyptians, starting a controversy that still rages today. For example, Vincent Sarich and Frank Miele's Race: The Reality of Human Differences (2004), a recent attempt to add academic credibility to the scientifically discredited notion that "race" constitutes an essential rather than a culturally constructed human difference, uses Egypt in a similar way. Historians have put forward three main hypotheses which clearly contradict each other. Scientists, historians and anatomists argue whether the Egyptians were white, black or a mixture of both. The argument draws on aspects such as wall paintings or the physique of mummies.

African American culture 

Afrocentric thinkers in the nineteenth century insisted that the Egyptians were black Africans, making it possible to provide an ancient and noble lineage that countered the degrading images proliferated by racist science and pro-slavery polemic. Contributors to this debate include David Walker, James McCune Smith, Frederick Douglass and W. E. B. Du Bois. Identifying with the enslaved Hebrews, African Americans had long used the biblical Exodus narrative to encode their right and desire for freedom, as the spiritual "Go down, Moses" still testifies. 

David Walker's Appeal (1829) places this biblical story of liberation in tension with the assertion that the Pharaohs were black as well. The prominent black abolitionists James McCune Smith and Frederick Douglass countered white ethnography directly, as for example in Douglass's "Claims of the Negro Ethnologically Considered" (1854), drawing from findings of earlier European ethnologists such as James Prichard. At the turn of the 20th century, W. E. B. Du Bois shaped the concept of race and identity in yet another way by writing about the "double consciousness" of Africans in the Diaspora, meaning the descendants of the slaves in the United States.

This concept led to the twentieth century Black nationalist movements, including the "Hotep" community of Black Americans.

References

Citations

Works cited

Further reading 
 Brier, Bob. Egyptomania. Brookville, NY: Hillwood Art Museum, 1992.  (exhibition catalog)
 Curl, James Stevens. Egyptomania: The Egyptian Revival, A Recurring Theme in the History of Taste. Manchester University Press, 1994. Manchester, UK; New York: Manchester University Press, 1994. 
 Draper, Theodore. The Rediscovery of Black Nationalism. New York: Viking Press, 1970. 
 Gillman, Susan. "Pauline Hopkins and the Occult: African-American Revisions of Nineteenth-Century Sciences" In: American Literary History, Vol 8, No.1, spring 1996, pp. 57–82
 Glaude, Eddie S. Exodus! Religion, Race, and Nation in Early Nineteenth-Century Black America. Chicago: University of Chicago Press, 2000. 
 Gruesser, John Cullen. Black on Black: Twentieth-Century African American Writing About Africa. Lexington, KY: University Press of Kentucky, 2000. 
 Humbert, Jean-Marcel, et al. Egyptomania: Egypt in Western Art, 1730–1930. Ottawa: National Gallery of Canada, 1994.  (Exhibition catalog: Paris, Musée Du Louvre, 20 January–18 April 1994; Ottawa, National Gallery of Canada, 17 June–18 September 1994; Vienna, Kunsthistorisches Museum, 16 October 1994 – 29 January 1995)
 Howe, Stephen. Afrocentrism: Mythical Pasts and Imagined Homes. London ; New York: Verso, 1998. 
 Perniola, Mario, Enigmas. The Egyptian Moment in Society and Art, translated by Christopher Woodall, preface to the English Edition by the author, London-New York, Verso, 1995
 Schueller, Malini Johar. U.S. Orientalisms: Race, Nation, and Gender in Literature, 1790–1890. Ann Arbor: University of Michigan Press, 1998. 
 Wallace, Maurice O. Constructing the Black Masculine: Identity and Ideality in African American Men's Literature and Culture, 1775–1995. Durham: Duke University Press, 2002.

External links 
 Egyptomania.org, a website devoted to covering all aspects of "Egyptomania" from both a scholarly and a popular perspective. Includes Bibliographies. (No longer active)
 American Egyptomania, a scholarly website maintained at George Mason University, under the guidance of Scott Trafton, the author of Egypt Land (2004). Focuses on expressions of Egyptomania in the United States starting in the early nineteenth century and includes excerpts from original documents
 Underwood & Underwood Egypt Stereoviews, a digital library collection maintained by the American University in Cairo Rare Books and Special Collections Library. The collection highlights Egyptomania in the late nineteenth century.
 Aegyptiaca – Journal of the History of Reception of Ancient Egypt

 
Cultural history of the United States